Socolow is a surname. Notable people with the surname include:
Elizabeth Socolow (born 1940), American poet, wife of Robert H. Socolow
Frank Socolow (1923–1981), American jazz musician
Michael J. Socolow (born 1968), American journalist and historian, son of Sanford Socolow
Robert H. Socolow (born 1937), American physicist, husband of Elizabeth Socolow 
Sanford Socolow (1928–2015), American journalist, father of Michael J. Socolow